The 1938–39 Football League season was Birmingham Football Club's 43rd in the Football League and their 26th in the First Division. They were in the relegation positions after the second game of the season, rarely rose above them, and finished in 21st place in the 22-team division, one point from safety, so dropped to the Second Division for the 1939–40 season. They entered the 1938–39 FA Cup at the third round proper and lost to Everton in the fifth round after a replay. The club's record attendance was set in the FA Cup-tie at home to Everton, variously recorded as 67,341 or 66,844.

Thirty-two players made at least one appearance in nationally organised first-team competition, and there were fifteen different goalscorers. Half-back Don Dearson played in 42 of the 46 matches over the season, and Fred Harris was the leading scorer with 17 goals, of which 14 were scored in the league. Harry Morris, son of the Harry Morris who played for the club in the 1880s and was a member of the board of directors for nearly 30 years, took over as chairman from Howard Cant.

When the Second World War began, the 1939–40 Football League season was abandoned after three Second Division matches had been played. The first post-war Football League season was in 1946–47, though the FA Cup resumed a season earlier.

Football League First Division

League table (part)

FA Cup

Appearances and goals

Players with name struck through and marked  left the club during the playing season.

Abandoned 1939–40 Football League season

Birmingham began the 1939–40 Football League season in the Second Division, but the onset of the Second World War caused the League to be abandoned after three Second Division matches had been played. They fielded the same eleven for all three matches: Harry Hibbs, Cyril Trigg, Billy Hughes, James Bye, Arthur Turner, Ray Shaw, Jackie Brown, Don Dearson, Ted Duckhouse, Fred Harris and Tom Farrage. Farrage was killed in action in September 1944, serving as a private in the 10th Battalion, the Parachute Regiment during Operation Market Garden.

Notes

References
General
 
 
 Source for match dates and results: 
 Source for lineups, appearances, goalscorers and attendances: Matthews (2010), Complete Record, pp. 318–19.
 Source for 1939–40 season: Matthews (2010), Complete Record, pp. 320–21.
 Source for kit: "Birmingham City". Historical Football Kits. Retrieved 22 May 2018.

Specific

External links
Video of Birmingham players in training in 1939

Birmingham City F.C. seasons
Birmingham